The city of Warri is an oil hub within South-South Nigeria and houses an annex of the Delta State Government House. Warri City is one of the major hubs of the petroleum industry in Nigeria. Warri and her twin city, Uvwie are the commercial capital of Delta State with a population of over 311,970 people in 2006. The city is the indigenous territory of Urhobo, itsekiri and Ijaw people.

Warri shares boundaries with Uvwie to the east, Udu to the south east, Ogbe-ijoh to the south, and other communities in Warri South LGA to the west. Due to its rapid population growth and linked roads, the city and its border towns eg Uvwie, Udu merged into a conurbation collectively referred as “Warri”

Warri sits on the bank of Warri River which joined Forcados River and Escravos River through Jones Creek in the lower Niger Delta Region. The city has a modern seaport which serves as the cargo transit point between the Niger River and the Atlantic Ocean for import and export.

Warri served as the capital of the colonial Warri Province during the early 1900s when this part of Delta State was under the Colony and Protectorate of Southern Nigeria.

Warri City is native to four monarchs, namely;

• The Olu of Warri (itsekiri)

• The Ovie of Agbarha-Ame (Urhobo)

• The Orosuen of Okere-Urhobo (Urhobo)

• The Pere of Ogbe-ijaw (Ijaw)

History

Etymology
The name ‘WARRI’ was first associated with the Itsekiri ancestral capital town of Ode Itsekiri which the locals also refer to as ‘Iwerre’. A mispronunciation of Iwerre by several European explorers probably resulted in various names like AWERRI, OUWERI, WARRE, WARREE, etc. The British eventually anglancised it as WARRI

British Advent pre Warri City
British colonialism effectively took off in the Western Niger Delta with the proclamation of the Oil Coast Protectorate by Great Britain in June 1885. British colonial administration was carried out through local chiefs like Nana Olomu of Ebrohimi in Benin River. This administration was effectively restricted to Benin River and its environs as the British were content with conducting trade with the people of the hinterlands through the Itsekiri as middlemen

Creation of Warri City
The British decided to move the seat of the administration of the Niger Coast Protectorate from the capital Ode-Itsekiri (Warri or Iwerre) to the uplands to have effective control of the hinterlands. In order to achieve this, the British in 1906 took a lease of a new trading station opened in 1898 on virgin lands for Alexander Miller Brothers Limited of Liverpool at the mouth of the Okere Creeks. This new trading station was also named WARRI after the capital Ode-Itsekiri so the Itsekiris dubbed Ode-Itsekiri BIG WARRI in order to differentiate Ode-Itsekiri from the new trading station.

Demographic
Its inhabitants are predominantly Christians of different denominations, and some practice a mixture of African traditional religions like most of Southern Nigeria. The city is known nationwide for its unique Pidgin.

Climate
The region experiences moderate rainfall and moderate humidity for the most part of the year. The cl imate is monsoonal and is marked by two distinct seasons: the dry season and the rainy season. The dry season lasts from about November to April and is significantly marked by the cool "harmattan" dusty haze  from the north-east winds. The rainy season spans May to October with a brief dy spell in August, but it frequently rains even in the dry season. The surrounding region is predominantly rainforest, tending to swamplands in some areas. The vegetation is rich in timber trees, palm trees, as well as fruit trees.

Economy and infrastructure 
There is the Warri Refinery and Petrochemicals located at Ekpan, Uvwie with the majority of international and local oil companies operating in Nigeria having their operational offices close by.
One of the nation's major seaports is sited within Ugbuwangue, Warri.

Due to conflict in the late 90s, especially in 1999, most oil companies fled the town and nearby regions.

Security 
Warri is garrisoned by the Amphibious Infantry battalion (Effurun Army Base) located in Effurun, a twin city to Warri and is administratively under the Brigade HQ in Port Harcourt.

The Nigerian Navy operates from its facilities in Warri.

The 61 Nigerian Air force Detachment also operates from its facilities in Jeddo, close to Warri.

Sports 
Warri has an international stadium with a capacity of 30,000 which is the home of Warri Wolves football club, which has hosted two editions of the African Women Football Championship in 2002 and 2006 respectively and was in contention as one of the venues to be used for the FIFA Under-17 World Cup in Nigeria in 2009. The stadium was used to host the African Youth Athletics Championship (AYAC) in 2013.

Warri Wolves, a professional football team based in Warri plays in the Nigeria National League. Their prominent former players include Best Ogedegbe, Wilson Oruma, Efe Ambrose, Victor Ikpeba and Ekigho Ehiosun.

Manufacturing and raw materials
The economic base of the city lies in the presence of a refinery and other oil and gas companies.
Also, there is the steel company, Delta Steel Company, which is located in Ovwian–Aladja area of Udu. The Beta Glass Plant is located nearby, outside the town of Ughelli, where the land is rich in silica and silicates, raw materials required for the manufacture of glass, ceramics and cement.
The Transcorp Power Distribution, one of Nigeria's power generating stations, is also located at Ughelli, which is just 15 minutes away by car.

Transport

Rail
In 1991, construction started on a standard gauge railway from the steel mills at Ajaokuta to the port of Warri, about 275 km away. By 2006, the standard gauge lines had reached 329 km in length, but the final 27 km Warri section is still incomplete. In 2010, work recommenced to complete that final section to Warri. The rail line was officially inaugurated in September 2020.

Road
Major road networks within Warri Metropolis has been improved upon by the state government to improve the image of the city. Transportation within the city is mainly by bus and tricycle. The federal government has completed the Warri-Benin Road road expansion project and major parts of the East-West Road Project which will connect Warri-Uyo.

Air
There are several helipads in oil company yards, like Shell yard Ogunu and in Escavos and Focados.

Sea
Movement of goods by sea is through the Nigerian Ports Authority (Delta Ports) at which is mainly for export and import of goods by major companies. Also located on the main Warri riverside are markets and jetties used by local traders, which act as a transit point for local transport and trade. There are local boats that are used for moving from one location to another.

Educational institutions

Primary schools 
Primary schools in Warri are:
 Nana Primary School, Warri
 Mowoe Primary School, Warri
 Ojojo Primary School, Warri
 Ogiame Primary School, Warri
 Ikengbuwa Primary School, Warri
 Cavagina Primary School, Warri
 Twin Fountain Group of Schools
 HillTop
 International Unity School (IUS)
 NNPC Staff Primary School
 SNAPS
 Alderstown School for the Deaf
 Kids Compute Academy
 Edjeba Estate School, Edjeba, Warri
 Lakeland School, Ogunu, Warri

Secondary schools 
Secondary schools are also in numbers in the city of Warri. These include:
 Yonwuren College, Warri
 College of Education Demonstration Secondary School, Warri
 Twin Fountain Group of Schools
 Cambridge International School
 Federal Government College, Ekurede Urhobo, Warri 
 Hussey College, Warri 
 Nana College, Warri 
 Dom Domingos College, Warri 
 Delta Secondary School, Warri
 Dore Numa College, Warri 
 Essi College, Warri 
 Uwangue College, Warri 
 Classical International School, Warri 
 College of Commerce, Warri 
 Eagles Height School, Ajamhimogha, Warri 
 Ubeji Grammar School, Ubeji

Higher institutions 
There are various tertiary institutions within and outside the city, the following are the institutions situated in the city of Warri
College of Education at Edjeba, Warri
The Delta State Nursing School, Ogunu, Warri
Eagle Heights University, Omadino, Warri

Tourism
There are various tourist sites to visit while in Warri:

 Red Mangrove swamp
 Falcorp Mangrove Park / Mini Zoo, Ijala, Behind Warri Refinery.
 Warri Township Stadium
 Shell club, Ogunu
 Warri Port, Ugbuwangue, Warri

Religion

Notable people
Notable Nigerian ministers from Warri include Ayo Oritsejafor and Jeremiah Omoto Fufeyin.
Charity Ogbenyealu Adule, footballer
Nedum Onuoha, footballer
Demas Akpore (1928–1993), first elected Deputy Governor of Bendel State (1979–1983)
Erigga, musician
Pastor Ayo Oritsejafor, former CAN President

See also
 Abraka
 Asaba, Delta
 Agbassa
 Delta State
 Effurun
 Eku, Delta
 Ughelli
 Railway stations in Nigeria

References

 
Local Government Areas in Delta State
Port cities and towns in Nigeria
Cities in Delta State
Cities in Nigeria